Tibaldi is an Italian surname. Notable people with the surname include:

 Maria Felice Tibaldi (1707–1770), Italian painter
 Pellegrino Tibaldi (1527–1596), Italian mannerist architect, sculptor, and mural painter
 Giovanni Battista Tibaldi ( 1660–1736), Italian violinist and composer

See also 
 Tebaldi

Italian-language surnames